RI-1 is a selective inhibitor of RAD51, which is a central gene molecule of homologous recombination, with IC50 ranging from 5 to 30 μM.

Antitumor mechanism
RAD51 is a eukaryote gene, encoding RAD51 protein that participates in DNA damage induction and complex signal pathway of cell cycle checkpoint of homologous recombination in cells. However, over-expression of RAD51 may lead the occurrence and development progress of tumours and besides, the insensitivity of tumours to chemoradiotherapy. At present, over-expression of RAD51 has been found in many kinds of human cancers, such as breast cancer, lung cancer and ovarian cancer.

RI-1 inhibits the over-expression of RAD51 in cancer cells by bonding covalently to the surface of RAD51 protein at Cys 319 and irreversibly loosen a protein-protein interface that is essential for filament formation and recombinase activity.

Targeted drugs to RAD51 has the prospect to be a new generation of oncologic drugs, like RI-1. It is also a unique tool for mechanism studies of DNA repair.

References

Literature 
 
 

Maleimides
Chloroarenes
4-Morpholinyl compunds